"Eaten Alive" is a 1985 song released by American entertainer Diana Ross on the RCA label in North America and Capitol label globally. The song was released as the first single on September 1, 1985, taken from her album of the same name, which was ultimately a critical and commercial failure in the US, but, did reach top 10 and top 20 rankings in several European countries like Norway and the Netherlands.

The song was written by Barry Gibb, Maurice Gibb and Michael Jackson the latter also co-producing with Barry and his team. Jackson and Barry Gibb can be heard singing in the background of the song with Jackson at times co-singing lead with Ross. The song was a disappointment in the United States, peaking at No. 77 on the Billboard Hot 100 chart. It became her first lead single to not peaked at top 40, although it fared much better on the R&B singles chart - where it reached the Top 10 - helped by BET's heavy rotation of the music video. The song was also a successful hit on the dance chart, peaking at #3.

In the song's original copyright registration from 11 March 1985 it was credited to Barry Gibb and Maurice Gibb. It was not until Michael Jackson heard the demo of it that he suggested the chorus could be improved. The second copyright registration was filed on 1 June 1985 (the same day that Diana performed a sold-out concert at Joe Louis Arena in her hometown of Detroit) with the note 'words and music in the choruses have been completely rewritten'.

Music video
The accompanying music video for "Eaten Alive", inspired by The Island of Doctor Moreau, was directed by David Hogan and featured the singer playing a cat-like demon seducing a man played by Joseph Gian after having been pursued by chimeras.

Charts

References

1985 singles
1985 songs
Diana Ross songs
Dance-pop songs
RCA Records singles
Songs written by Barry Gibb
Song recordings produced by Barry Gibb
Songs written by Michael Jackson
Song recordings produced by Michael Jackson
Songs written by Maurice Gibb
Music videos directed by David Hogan